Olympia 67 was the first album released by Dalida after her suicide attempt and her 1967 comeback performance at the Olympia. Among the tracks on the album are "À qui?", "Je reviens te chercher", "La banda", "Mama", "Ciao amore, ciao" (written by her lover Luigi Tenco), "Les grilles de ma maison" and "Petit homme".

Track listing
 À qui?
 Je reviens te chercher
 La banda
 Loin dans le temps
 Toi mon amour
 J'ai décidé de vivre
 Entrez sans frapper
 Mama
 Ciao amore, ciao
 Les grilles de ma maison
 La chanson de Yohann
 Petit homme

Singles

1966 Je t'appelle encore / Modesty Blaise / Parlez moi de lui / Baisse un peu la radio
1966 Petit homme / Je préfère naturellement / Un tendre amour / Dans ma chambre
1967 Mama / Ciao amore, ciao
1967 Pauvre cœur / La chanson de Yohann / Les grilles de ma maison / Les gens sont fous
1967 Je reviens te chercher / La banda / À qui? / Loin dans le temps

1967 live albums
Dalida albums
Barclay (record label) live albums
French-language live albums